Chryse is a name occurring in Ancient Greek geography, reported by ancient authors to have referred to the following places:

Chryse (island), a former island in the Mediterranean where, in Greek mythology Philoctetes was bitten by a snake. This island is underwater now.
Chryse and Argyre, one of a pair of legendary islands in the Indian Ocean said to be made of gold and silver
Chryse, a town mentioned in Homer's Iliad, from which Agamemnon took Chryseis
Chrysē nēsos (Golden Island), an ancient poetical name for the island Thasos, for its gold mines
Chryse, a promontory of Lemnos opposite Tenedos
Chryse (Aeolis), a town of ancient Aeolis, now in Turkey
Chryse (Lesbos), Lesbos, a place in Greece
Chryse (Troad), a town of the ancient Troad, now in Turkey
Chryse, Skyros, a village or place in Ancient Greece
Chryse (Caria), a place in the area of Halicarnassus, now in Turkey
Chryse (Hellespont), located between Ophrynion and Abydos
Chryse (Bithynia), close to Chalcedon
Chryse, Gaidaronisi, an island near Crete
Isle of Chryse, a term in classical antiquity for the Malay peninsula or Sumatra

References

See also
Chrysa, Athens, a section around Pnyx

Former populated places in Greece